Braniștea is a commune located in Mehedinți County, Romania. It is composed of two villages: Braniștea and Goanța. These were part of Vânători Commune until 2004, when they were split off. Braniștea is situated in the historical region of Oltenia.

References

Communes in Mehedinți County
Localities in Oltenia